Rahat Ali (born 12 September 1988) is a Pakistani  cricketer who represents Pakistan cricket team. He is a left-arm fast-medium bowler and bats right handed. Rahat belongs to a PCB registered club of Multan, PCC (Pioneers Cricket Club) He has represented Multan Tigers, Khan Research Laboratories; and Sui Northern Gas Pipelines Limited. He has selected for One Day International (ODI) series against Sri Lanka in 2012.

Rahat Ali made his test debut against South Africa on 1 February 2013. Rahat Ali bowls with a side-on action and is capable of maintaining speeds around 140 km/h, but he insists his focus is more on swing. A left-arm fast bowler, he took to serious cricket during his first year of college, playing for Multan Cricket Club. Rahat Ali has often been a consistent member of the Pakistan test squad.

In August 2018, he was one of thirty-three players to be awarded a central contract for the 2018–19 season by the Pakistan Cricket Board (PCB). In March 2019, he was named in Sindh's squad for the 2019 Pakistan Cup. In September 2019, he was named in Southern Punjab's squad for the 2019–20 Quaid-e-Azam Trophy tournament.
Ahead of the 2020 PSL Draft, he was released by Lahore Qalandars. In December 2019, he was drafted by Peshawar Zalmi as their Silver Category pick at the 2020 PSL draft.

References

External links

1988 births
Living people
Pakistani cricketers
Pakistan Test cricketers
Pakistan One Day International cricketers
Multan cricketers
Sui Northern Gas Pipelines Limited cricketers
Khan Research Laboratories cricketers
Baluchistan cricketers
Cricketers from Multan
Cricketers at the 2015 Cricket World Cup
Punjabi people
Karachi Kings cricketers
Quetta Gladiators cricketers
Lahore Qalandars cricketers
Southern Punjab (Pakistan) cricketers
Peshawar Zalmi cricketers